The 1986 Daytona 500, the 28th running of the event, was held February 16 at Daytona International Speedway, in Daytona Beach, Florida. it was the first race of 29 in the 1986 NASCAR Winston Cup season. Defending race winner Bill Elliott won the pole for the second year in a row, and outside pole sitter Geoffrey Bodine won the race and led 101 laps, including the final 34.

Race Recap
On lap 116, a major accident (such crashes are now known as "The Big One") in turn 4 involved several cars, including some contenders for the win. 1980 winner Buddy Baker, Neil Bonnett (already several laps down after earlier problems), defending race winner Bill Elliott, Tommy Ellis, Harry Gant, Kyle Petty, Joe Ruttman, Lake Speed, & four-time 500 winner Cale Yarborough were involved in the crash, but Elliott, Ellis, Petty, and Speed were able to continue the race.

Geoff Bodine won this race on fuel mileage after engaging in a long feud with Dale Earnhardt.  Earnhardt was forced to pit for gas with three laps to go, then blew the engine leaving the pits.  This allowed Bodine to cruise to victory by a margin of over 11 seconds. It was the first of many hard luck finishes for Dale Earnhardt that would last until the 1998 race.

Prior to the race, the drivers paid tribute to the astronauts who were killed in the Space Shuttle Challenger disaster, which was several miles away from the track 19 days earlier. They would do so again for the 2003 Daytona 500, which took place two weeks after the Space Shuttle Columbia disaster.

Results

Box Score

(5) Indicates 5 bonus points added to normal race points scored for leading 1 lap(10) Indicates 10 bonus points added to normal race points scored for leading 1 lap & leading the most laps (W) denotes former Daytona 500 winner(R) denotes series rookie

Cautions
8 for 46 laps

Lap Leader Breakdown
Lead changes: 27

Failed to qualify
0-Delma Cowart
19-Bob Park
23-Michael Waltrip (R)
29-Grant Adcox
35-Alan Kulwicki (R)
39-Blackie Wangerin
48-Ron Esau (R)
49-Ferdin Wallace (R)
53-Donny Paul (R)
54-Slick Johnson
60-Dick Skillen
70-J. D. McDuffie
73-Phil Barkdoll (R)
74-Bobby Wawak
76-Clark Dwyer
81-Chet Fillip (R)
82-Mark Stahl (R)
95-Davey Allison (R)
99-Connie Saylor
07-Randy LaJoie (R)

(R) Denotes series rookie.

Notes
This was the first Daytona 500 that did not have some type of Chrysler car in the field (Dodge or Plymouth) since the Mirada, Imperial, and Cordoba were aged out at the end of the 1985 season.
First Daytona 500 starts: Eddie Bierschwale and Larry Pearson.
Only Daytona 500 starts: Tommy Ellis, Pancho Carter, and Kirk Bryant.
Last Daytona 500 starts: Jody Ridley, Doug Heveron, and Buddy Arrington.

Standings after the race

References

Daytona 500
Daytona 500
Daytona 500
NASCAR races at Daytona International Speedway